Thomas, Tom, or Tommy Henry may refer to:

Thomas Henry (apothecary) (1734–1816), surgeon and apothecary
Thomas Henry (patron of the arts) (1766–1836), French painter and patron of the arts
Thomas Henry (Pennsylvania politician) (1779–1849), Pennsylvania Congressman
Thomas Henry (magistrate) (1807–1876), Anglo-Irish police magistrate
Thomas Henry (illustrator) (1879–1962), English illustrator
Thomas Charlton Henry (1887–1936), American philatelist
Thomas Browne Henry (1907–1980), American character actor
Thomas Henry (footballer) (born 1994), French footballer
Thomas Monroe Henry (1857–1930), state auditor of Mississippi
Tom Henry (born 1951), mayor of Fort Wayne, Indiana, USA
Tom Henry, back for the Rock Island Independents in 1920
Tommy Henry (American football) (born 1969), American football player
Tommy Henry (baseball) (born 1997), American baseball pitcher

See also
Henry Thomas (disambiguation)